The North Carolina Scenic Byways consists of roads in the state of North Carolina that travel through areas of scenic, historic, and cultural significance. The intent of this system is to provide travelers with a safe and interesting alternate route.


National scenic byways

State scenic byways

Other scenic byways and roads

See also

 National Forest Scenic Byway
 National Scenic Byway

References

External links

NCDOT: Scenic Byways
NSBP: North Carolina

Scenic
North Carolina
Scenic Byways